Computer mapping may refer to any mapping procedure done with the aid of computers:
 in computer graphics
3D projection
texture mapping, normal mapping, tone mapping, ... etc.
 in geography geographic information system
 Web mapping
 Generic Mapping Tools
 any of various methods in bioinformatics that have to do with gene mapping